Valery Kuzmich Nepomnyashchy (born 7 August 1943) is a Russian association football manager and a former player. He is currently in charge of youth development with Baltika Kaliningrad.

Most famously he coached the Cameroon national football team when they surprisingly made the quarter-finals in the 1990 FIFA World Cup. From 1992 to 1994 he coached clubs in Turkey. In 1995, he became manager of South Korea's Yukong Elephants (currently Jeju United FC), and in 1996 led them to a victory in League Cup. In 2001, he took over the job of J. League club Sanfrecce Hiroshima manager from Eddie Thomson. He has also coached Shanghai Shenhua, (whom he led to a second-place finish for the first time in his career), from 2004 to 2005, and the Uzbekistan national football team in 2006. He worked as a football commentator for a Russian television channel, “NTV-Plus”. In September 2008 he signed a 2-year contract with Russian club Tom Tomsk.

Early life
Nepomnyashchy was born in Altai Krai, Soviet Union during World War II. His mother, pregnant with him, was evacuated there from Moscow, after his father was killed during the war. In 1947, they moved to the Turkmen Soviet Socialist Republic, nowadays Turkmenistan, where he would start his youth career. Graduated from the Turkmen State University in 1969.

Career
Nepomnyashchy would start his career as a footballer where his greatest achievement was to play as a striker for third tier Soviet football club Spartak Samarkand. His career was however cut short due to health problems and he had to retire at the age of 25 years. This saw him move into physical education and coaching that would see him land a job within the football coaching sports committee of Turkmenistan from 1970 to 1978. By 1979 he would achieve his first assistant coaching job with third tier Turkmen football club Kolhozchi Ashkhabad and by 1982 he was named as their head coach where he led them to eighth in his debut season.

By the end of 1983 Nepomnyashchy had returned to the Turkmenistan Sports committee until in 1984 when he was doing training courses in Moscow, he was asked by the Russian Office of football if he wanted to work abroad. Nepomnyashchy soon accepted the offer and was expected to provide training courses and assistance to developing countries such as Algeria, Tunisia and Suriname. Nepomnyashchy would find these trips as too frustrating and periodical in there planning until Cameroon offered him a concrete proposal. Initially Nepomnyashchy thought that the Russian funded aid would see him coach one of the Cameroon youth teams, however with the previous manager Claude Le Roy deciding to leave to join Senegal there was an unexpected vacancy for the senior Head coach position, which Nepomnyashchy took and signed a two-year contract with the team.

At first Nepomnyashchy would struggle with the French language and had to use an interpreter, however he would eventually get his message across on what he wanted his team to do and they would qualify for the 1990 FIFA World Cup. Drawn in Group B they unexpectedly beat reigning champions Argentina as well as Romania to book their place within the last 16. After beating Colombia 2-1 in extra-time Cameroon eventually lost to England in the Quarter-Finals. While he was offered an extension to his contract, Nepomnyashchy decided to leave the team after his contract expired to take on a more lucrative position with the Chinese Football Association as a technical consultant.

In the 1992–93 1.Lig season Nepomnyashchy would return to management with Turkish side Gençlerbirliği S.K. before joining another Turkish side in Ankaragücü the following season. After an uninspired time within Turkey he would move to South Korea where he had a successful spell with Bucheon Yukong where he won the 1996 Korean League Cup with them. After his time in South Korea ended he returned to Russia for FC Dynamo Stavropol where he acted as a consultant in 1999 before returning to Asia where he went on to manage several different clubs before returning to national team management when he coached Uzbekistan after having a spell with one of its clubs, Pakhtakor FK where he won the 2006 league title with them.

Managerial statistics

Honours

As a manager
Yukong Elephants / Bucheon SK

 Korean League Cup Winner: 1996

Pakhtakor FK

 Champion of Uzbek League: 2006
 Cup holder in Uzbekistan Cup: 2006

Individual

 Honored coach of the Turkmen SSR (1990)
 Legion of Honor (Cameroon, 1990)
 Award for "Contribution to the development of the South Korean Football" (1996)
 Best Coach of the Year in China (2000)
 The badge "For Services to the Tomsk region" (2010)

References

External links
Profile on footballplayers.ru

 Valery Nepomnyashchy Interview

1943 births
Turkmen State University alumni
Association football forwards
Living people
People from Slavgorod
Soviet football managers
Soviet expatriate football managers
Russian football managers
Russian expatriate football managers
FK Köpetdag Aşgabat managers
1990 FIFA World Cup managers
Cameroon national football team managers
Uzbekistan national football team managers
J1 League managers
Sanfrecce Hiroshima managers
Expatriate football managers in Japan
Shandong Taishan F.C. managers
Jeju United FC managers
Russian expatriate sportspeople in Turkey
Russian expatriate sportspeople in South Korea
Russian expatriate sportspeople in Japan
Russian expatriate sportspeople in China
Russian expatriate sportspeople in Uzbekistan
Expatriate football managers in Cameroon
Soviet expatriate sportspeople in Cameroon
Expatriate football managers in South Korea
Expatriate football managers in China
Guangzhou City F.C. managers
Gençlerbirliği S.K. managers
MKE Ankaragücü managers
Expatriate football managers in Turkey
Expatriate football managers in Uzbekistan
Pakhtakor Tashkent FK managers
FC Tom Tomsk managers
Russian Premier League managers
Higher School of Coaches alumni
FK Dinamo Samarqand players
1990 African Cup of Nations managers
FC Baltika Kaliningrad managers
Soviet footballers
Turkmenistan footballers
Turkmenistan football managers
Russian football chairmen and investors
Chinese Super League managers